Home is the second full-length studio album by the indie folk musician Josh Rouse. The album was released in March 2000 by Slow River Records and included the single "Directions", which was also featured on the soundtrack to the Cameron Crowe movie "Vanilla Sky" entitled "Music from Vanilla Sky".

Track listing
 "Laughter" — 4:43
 "Marvin Gaye" — 3:10
 "Directions" — 3:26
 "Parts and Accessories" — 3:55
 "100m Backstroke" — 3:32
 "Hey Porcupine" — 3:51
 "In Between" — 4:05
 "And Around" — 4:18
 "Afraid to Fail" — 3:27
 "Little Know It All" — 3:46

References

2000 albums
Josh Rouse albums